The 1985 Vuelta a España was the 40th edition of the Vuelta a España, one of cycling's Grand Tours. The Vuelta began in Valladolid, with a prologue individual time trial on 23 April, and Stage 10 occurred on 3 May with a stage from Sabiñánigo. The race finished in Salamanca on 12 May.

Stage 10
3 May 1985 — Sabiñánigo to Tremp,

Stage 11
4 May 1985 — Tremp to Andorra,

Stage 12
5 May 1985 — Andorra to Pal,  (ITT)

Stage 13
6 May 1985 — Andorra to Sant Quirze del Vallès,

Stage 14
7 May 1985 — Valencia to Benidorm,

Stage 15
8 May 1985 — Benidorm to Albacete,

Stage 16
9 May 1985 — Albacete to Alcalá de Henares,

Stage 17
10 May 1985 — Alcalá de Henares to Alcalá de Henares,  (ITT)

Stage 18
11 May 1985 — Alcalá de Henares to Palazuelos de Eresma (Destilerías DYC),

Stage 19
12 May 1985 — Palazuelos de Eresma (Destilerías DYC) to Salamanca,

References

1985 Vuelta a España
Vuelta a España stages